Rosco & Sonny is an Italian comics series created by Claudio Nizzi and Giancarlo Alessandrini.

Background 
The series was started in 1981 by Claudio Nizzi as the writer and the artwork of Giancarlo Alessandrini, later replaced by  Rodolfo Torti and Rudy Salvagnini. It was published for more than 30 years and about 280 episodes by the comics magazine Il Giornalino. Main characters were the blond-haired Rosco and red-haired Sonny, a couple of policemen characterized by unorthodox investigative methods. The last episode, "Missione finale", was published May 5, 2012 and ended with the couple of cops who leave the police, Sonny becoming a basketball player and Rosco becoming a writer.

References

Further reading 
Luigi Marcianò, "Rosco e Sonny: due poliziotti... in pensione?", Fumetto, No. 85, March 2013, Associazione Nazionale Amici del Fumetto e dell’Illustrazione.

Italian comics titles
Comics characters introduced in 1981
1981 comics debuts
2012 comics endings
Crime comics
Fictional police officers in comics
Male characters in comics